South by Southwest is an annual  music, film and interactive conference in Austin, Texas.

"South by Southwest" can also refer to any of the following:

 "South By Southwest", a 2001 episode of the American television show V.I.P.
 "South By Southwest", a 2009 episode (Season 6) of the American television show NCIS 
 Murder, She Wrote: South By Southwest, a 1997 TV movie based on the TV show Murder, She Wrote

Note that there is no compass direction bearing such a name; the closest would be south-southwest and southwest by south. See Points of the compass.